Emilio Sánchez was the defending champion but chose to compete at Hilversum in the same week, winning that tournament.

Thomas Muster won the title by defeating Ronald Agénor 6–3, 6–3 in the final.

Seeds

Draw

Finals

Top half

Bottom half

References

External links
 Official results archive (ATP)
 Official results archive (ITF)

1988 Grand Prix (tennis)
ATP Bordeaux